is a passenger railway station located in the city of Hannō, Saitama, Japan, operated by the private railway operator Seibu Railway. In terms of daily passenger usage, it is the least used station operated by Seibu Railway.

Lines

Station layout
The station consists of one island platform serving two tracks, connected to the station building by an underground passage.

History
The station opened on 14 October 1969.

Station numbering was introduced on all Seibu Railway lines during fiscal 2012, with Shōmaru  Station becoming "SI33".

Passenger statistics
In fiscal 2019, Shōmaru Station was the 92nd busiest station on the Seibu network with an average of 194 passengers daily, making it the least used station on the network.

The passenger figures for previous years are as shown below.

Surrounding area

See also
 List of railway stations in Japan

References

External links

 Seibu Railway station information

Railway stations in Saitama Prefecture
Railway stations in Japan opened in 1969
Seibu Chichibu Line
Stations of Seibu Railway
Hannō